The Cavaliers Drum and Bugle Corps (also known as "The Green Machine") is a World Class competitive junior drum and bugle corps based in Rosemont, Illinois. The Cavaliers were one of the thirteen founding member corps of Drum Corps International and is a seven-time DCI World Champion. The Cavaliers are the only active all-male corps in the activity.

History

The early days
The Cavaliers Drum and Bugle Corps was started in 1948 by Don Warren, Scoutmaster of Boy Scout Troop 111 in Chicago's Logan Square neighborhood after being impressed by the Racine Scouts. In 1949, the corps found an additional sponsor in the American Legion Thaddeus Kosciuszko Post 712 of Chicago's Little Warsaw neighborhood. This sponsorship allowed the corps to purchase new uniforms.

The corps entered the world of field competition for the first time in 1950, adopting the name of Chicago Cavaliers and green as their main color. While many corps of the time had only their locale or their sponsor as the name of their corps, the corps wanted a distinctive name, as had the Austin Grenadiers, one of Chicago's top corps of the day.  When Cavalier cigarettes had a flashy promotional campaign with much fanfare, the corps members' reaction was unanimous. They adopted the Cavalier name and the logo of the cigarette brand as the corps' logo (the "Standing Man"), they all ordered pins of the Cavalier logo from the cigarette company, and the K-712 corps became the Chicago Cavaliers.

After being an also-ran for their first two seasons of field competition, the Cavaliers won their first contest in 1952. At the Spectacle of Music in South Milwaukee, the Cavaliers were winners in Class B, while all the corps considered to be "big corps" were in Class A. They capped the season by finishing in seventh place at their first American Legion Junior National Championship in New York City. In 1956, the Cavaliers had risen to the number one ranking in the Midwest, but could only manage a third place finish at VFW Nationals. However, in 1957, after trading victories with the Madison Scouts and the Belleville Black Knights, the Cavaliers won not only both the Illinois State American Legion and VFW titles, but also their first VFW National title in Miami. Their win broke the stranglehold that the East Coast corps had held on the national championships. Although the win was considered by the East Coast corps to be just a fluke, the Cavaliers repeated as VFW champions two years later in Los Angeles.

The pre-DCI power years
By 1960, the Cavaliers were a national powerhouse in the drum corps activity, but the corps' existence was not easy. Money was short, and the American Legion Kosciusko Post and the Chicago's Own VFW Post tried to meet the corps' financial needs, but the temporary banning of bingo and other similar fundraisers by the State of Illinois was an almost crippling blow. The corps' high level of competition also made recruitment difficult.

As part of the solution to the ongoing problems of money and recruiting, in 1961, the Chicago's Own VFW was replaced by the Park Ridge VFW Post 3579, marking the beginning of the Cavaliers' move from being a city corps to suburban. By the time the season was over, the Cavaliers were undefeated during 1961, had won twenty-five shows in a row dating from 1960, and would eventually win twenty-nine contests in a row over a period of twenty-three months before losing on June 17 in Spring Valley, Illinois.  The Cavaliers won VFW national three years in a row, 1961–63. In 1963, the corps traveled to Canada for the Toronto Optimist's "International" competition, then to Seattle to VFW Nationals, and had marching members from as far away from Chicago as Rockford and Milwaukee.

In 1964, The Cavaliers added mellophones and contrabasses to their horn line. 1967 saw Cavalier Hall go up in flames, taking the corps' trophies with it. They won the VFW Nationals, then repeated as American Legion Champions. The high of 1967 was followed by a 1968 where nothing was just quite right, and the corps finished second at VFW Nationals. The corps rebounded in 1969, winning the American Legion title.  The highlight of 1970 was the Cavaliers' rise from eleventh place at VFW National prelims to third place in finals.  Overall, the Green Machine of the 1960s won three American Legion and four VFW National Championships, and did not finish lower than third place in sixteen national finals competitions (VFW, American Legion, and CYO).

The Combine
In 1971, at the urging of Don Warren and Troopers founder Jim Jones, the Blue Stars, Cavaliers, Madison Scouts, Santa Clara Vanguard, the Argonne Rebels and the Troopers formed the Combine. This action was taken in reaction to the rigid, inflexible rules of the American Legion and VFW (the primary rule makers and sponsors of both corps and shows) and the low or nonexistent performance fees paid for appearing in the various competitions. The corps stated that not only were they having their creative potential as artistic performing groups stifled, but they were being financially starved. (A similar group of Eastern corps, the United Organization of Junior Corps [also known as the "Alliance"], was formed by the 27th Lancers, Garfield Cadets, Boston Crusaders, Blessed Sacrament Golden Knights, and Blue Rock.) The Combine members further declared that the corps should be making their own rules, operating their own competitions and championships, and keeping the bulk of the monies those shows earned. For the 1971 season, the corps stuck together, offering show promoters the five corps as a package. Despite pressure on show sponsors, judges, and other drum corps, the Combine corps were not only booked into a number of shows together, but they found a host for a show of their own, which was a spectacular success despite fears of failure that lasted until a standing-room-only crowd arrived literally at the last moment.  But 1971 was not as much of a success for the Cavaliers.  Their show with the guard doing an Irish jig and a circus section was not well-received, and the corps fell to eighth at CYO Nationals and, with most of the top corps opting for VFW VFW Nationals, they finished in second, two points behind the Argonne Rebels at the Legion Nationals in the Houston Astrodome.

The beginning of DCI
In 1972, The Cavaliers, along with the nine other corps from the Combine and the Alliance, plus the Anaheim Kingsmen, Argonne Rebels, and De La Salle Oaklands were founding members of Drum Corps International, which remains as the sanctioning body for junior corps in North America. At the first DCI World Championships in Whitewater, Wisconsin, The Cavaliers finished in ninth place in a competition that featured thirty-nine corps from the East, the South, the West Coast, the Midwest and Great Plains, and Canada. The 1972 Cavaliers also won another VFW National Championship in Minneapolis, their seventh.  1973 was a troublesome year for The Cavaliers.  Money was tight; recruitment was difficult; the staff was having a hard time dealing with a rapidly changing activity  It was not widely known until later that Don Warren was considering shutting down The Cavaliers.  But The Cavaliers persisted and finished in fifteenth place at DCI in Whitewater.

Over the next four years, 1974–77, The Cavaliers seemed to have rebounded somewhat from the down year of '73.  Two years in eighth place were followed by two years in seventh place at DCI.  They also won two more VFW National Championships in 1974 and '76.  But there was dissension among the members and alumni, with some glorying in the Green Machine's past success; some wanting to just to do anything as long as they were doing something; and others who were among the new breed of "corpies', who would move from one corps to another in search of competitive success.  There was also an unacknowledged drug problem that came to a head in 1977 when several members almost died while returning from a show.  The rift between factions widened as accusations of fault were bandied back and forth.  Don Warren and the corps management met with members, parents, and boosters to get everything out in the open.  Some members were expelled, some given cover.  The hangover from the incident carried over into 1978, as the corps, with many new staff members, largely alumni, managed only a sixteenth place finish at DCI. Although it was not immediately apparent, the foundation had been laid for future success with the naming of Adolph DeGrauwe as corps director. The Cavaliers ended the 1970s by winning the 1980 VFW crown, their tenth. During the decade, they had made DCI Finals seven times in nine years.

Rise to the top
During the early 1980s, the judges were looking for "cutting edge" performances, but The Cavaliers were not performing at that level.  However, The Cavaliers' winter guard was, under the leadership of Steve Brubaker, winning the Winter Guard International championship in 1981–83.  In 1982, Brubaker, who had also been working with the Cavalier Cadets corps since '78, was named head drill designer for The Cavaliers.  That change brought about a change in the corps' attitude and this, along with the music selections becoming more and more classically oriented, helped The Cavaliers rise to the top half of DCI Finalists,  though not without tests.  1982's Pines of Rome started the season with near-disastrous results, and the corps felt that it was luck as much as talent that earned the corps an eleventh-place finish at DCI in Montreal.  But 1982 saw The Cavaliers forge a solid association with the Village of Rosemont and its mayor, Donald E. Stephens, a relationship that would relieve the corps of many financial worries.  The corps improved to ninth in 1983 and eighth in '84, and the crowds were witnessing something new and different in Brubaker's drill schemes.  The 1985 program of "Also Spracht Zarathustra" and selections from "The Planets" impressed fans and judges alike, elevating The Cavaliers to a fifth-place finish in Madison, Wisconsin; the corps' first finish in the top half of DCI's Top Twelve.  In 1986 came "Variations on a Korean Folk Song" and the dragon drill that placed Brubaker solidly with George Zingali as the two greatest drill designers of the day. it also moved The Cavaliers into a third-place finish at DCI Finals.

Before the season ever started, the 1987 Cavaliers knew that it was their year.  Everything seemed to be in place:  the musical program, the drill, the talent to take it all, including a large number of members marching their last, "age-out" year.  The corps started out by going undefeated in Drum Corps Midwest (DCM), then won their first few DCI shows.  The Cavaliers seemed to be "on a roll" as they went to Drums Along the Rockies in Denver, where they crashed back to earth and finished in third place, far behind the Santa Clara Vanguard and the Blue Devils (BD) on the score sheets. The Blue Devils' members even taunted that The Cavaliers could/would never beat them.  They also finished in third at DCI South in Birmingham (behind  Blue Devils and Phantom Regiment) and at the rain-shortened DCI Midwest in St. Louis (behind Santa Clara and the Garfield Cadets).  After semifinals at the DCI Championships in Madison, The Cavaliers were behind all four corps that had beaten them earlier, with Garfield in first, followed by SCV, Phantom, and BD.  Before their Finals performance, corps director Adolph DeGrauwe told the corps to just go out and play for each other, and they did just that, passing the Regiment and the same Blue Devils who had taunted them in Denver, and finished in third place.

After losing so many age-outs in 1987, the '88 corps was very young. Playing Stravinsky's Firebird Suite, the corps finished in fifth place in Kansas City.  1989's John Rutter program carried the corps back to third place, and the "Cavalier Anthems" took them to their first runner-up finish (behind the Cadets of Bergen County) in Buffalo in 1990, but The Cavaliers would finish the 1980s without returning to the top of the drum corps world.  There was not even a "nationals" championship, as there had been in the Seventies, since the American Legion, the VFW, and the CYO were no longer hosting national championships.  But 1990 also saw The Cavaliers start the transition to three valve horns, and it was the year of The Cavaliers' very first DCI Regional championship, when they upset the previously undefeated Blue Devils and Phantom Regiment to win DCI Midwest at Whitewater.

Before the start of the 1991 season, Adolph DeGrauwe stepped down as Corps director, and was replaced by Jeff Fiedler. 1991 was a very good year for The Cavaliers, even though the corps still could not win DCI.  In eight meetings with Star of Indiana prior to DCI in Dallas, Star had won seven times.  There had also been loses to Phantom and BD, but mostly, The Cavaliers were winners. At DCI East in Allentown, Pennsylvania, the rains came as The Cavaliers were performing, this seemed to bring out the corps' best and they won the DCI East title.  They also won DCI South on an oppressively hot day in Birmingham.  At Dallas, the percussion ensemble won the Individual and Ensemble contest with a perfect 100.00 score, and The Cavaliers were far ahead of all others, except Star and the "Christmas Show" earned the corps' second consecutive second-place finish.  1992 started with a fire in the equipment truck, but the corps was also on fire and won their first fifteen shows before falling to Phantom.  Star won the DCM Championships in Toledo after Cavaliers had been consistently beating them.  The Cavaliers won DCI North in Buffalo, but at the Preview of Champions in Nashville, the corps found themselves trailing not only Star, but also BD.  The Green Machine then returned to winning until losing back-to-back Regionals; to Star at DCI Mid-America in Bloomington, Indiana and to Blue Devils at DCI North in Ypsilanti, Michigan.  At the DCI World Championship Quarterfinals in Madison, The Cavaliers were second to the defending champion, Star of Indiana, but at Semifinals, The Cavaliers moved into the lead. At Finals, The Cavaliers' show title of "Revolution and Triumph" proved to be prophetic, as the corps was finally crowned DCI World Champions.

Trials, triumph, and tradition
The 1993 season was difficult before it ever began; drill designer Steve Brubaker died during the off-season.  Once the season got underway, everything was overshadowed by the previous year's success.  Star once more left The Cavaliers in second at DCM, they trailed both Star and the Cadets at DCI North and the Preview of Champions, but they won DCI East over the Blue Devils.  The DCI World Championships were held in hot and humid Jackson, Mississippi.  It got even more humid, when the rains came during Finals; several Cavaliers slipped and fell, and the corps fell to fifth place.  In 1994, The Cavaliers'  program showcased the corps' guard. It won the DCM crown, but it was only good enough for second-place finishes in Regionals and fourth at DCI Finals in Boston.  Gustav Holst's "The Planets" had  been a crowd-pleaser and had earned The Cavaliers their first finish in the upper half of DCI's Top Twelve as the largest part of the show in 1985.  In 1995, The Cavaliers brought back "The Planets" as their entire show.  The Cavaliers traded wins with the Madison Scouts through the DCM season, with the Scouts taking the DCM title.  They continued to trail only Madison at DCI Southwest in Houston and until the Preview of Champions in Ypsilanti, when they found themselves ahead of Madison but behind BD and the Cadets.  DCI Mid-America at Champaign, Illinois also went to the Blue Devils.  At the DCI World Championships in Buffalo, The Cavaliers took command in Quarterfinals, expanded their lead in Semifinals and Finals, and won their second DCI Championship in four years.

Before the 1996 season, The Cavaliers traveled to Japan.  The corps won DCM and both DCI Mid-America and DCI East, but dropped to fourth place at DCI in Orlando, Florida.  The 1997 season saw wins in only three minor shows, and The Cavaliers' return of "The Firebird" slipped to seventh place at DCI Finals.  In 1998, The Cavaliers reclaimed the DCM title, but they failed to win any of three DCI Regionals, and they finished in fourth place at the World Championships, held for the third consecutive year in Orlando.  The 1999 season was much like the one before, except that the Green Machine moved up to third place at DCI Championships in Madison.  As the Twentieth Century came to a close, The Cavaliers performed a show of Michael Daugherty's "Niagara Falls" and an original composition by Richard Saucedo.  They lost an early show to The Cadets, lost their home show and DCI Midwestern in Indianapolis to the Blue Devils, but they won three other DCI Regionals: Drums Along the Rockies in Denver, DCI Mid-America in Murfreesboro, Tennessee, and DCI East in Allentown.  At the DCI Championships in College Park, Maryland, The Cavaliers were three tenths of a point behind The Cadets in both Quarterfinals and Semifinals, but added nearly a point to their Finals score and tied The Cadets for their third DCI World Championship of the decade.

The Twenty-first Century opened for The Cavaliers much as the Twentieth had ended.  The 2001 program of Saucedo's "Four Corners" won DCM, was second to Blue Devils at DCI Southwestern in San Antonio, then won DCI Mid-America in Murfreesboro, DCI Midwestern in Indianapolis, and DCI Eastern in Philadelphia.  Although they lost several shows to both BD and The Cadets, The Cavaliers took command at the DCI championships in Buffalo, winning Quarterfinals, Semifinals, and Finals for their first consecutive championships since winning the American Legion Nationals in 1966 and '67.  2002 was much like 1961 had been; with an original program of "Frameworks" by Richard Saucedo, Bret Kuhn, and Erik Johnson,  The Cavaliers won, and they won again and again and again.  They won DCM and then won three DCI Regionals, the Southwestern in San Antonio, the Midwestern in Indianapolis, and Drums Along the Rockies in Denver.  When The Cavaliers swept through the three rounds at the DCI World Championships in Madison with unheard of score margins of 1.75 to 1.95 points, the corps had not only won a three-peat, but they had earned the second undefeated season in the corps' history. Additionally, The Cavaliers set a world record for highest ever score in DCI history twice: 99.05 in Semifinals and 99.15 in Finals. This latter score remained unbeaten for several years until tied by The Cadets in 2005 and then beaten by The Blue Devils in 2014.

From August 2, 2001 through July 25, 2003, The Cavaliers won a DCI record sixty-four (64) contests in a row.  The 2003 show, "Spin Cycle" by Richard Saucedo won the last DCM Championship before the top corps abandoned the circuit, and the DCI Southwestern Regional before The Blue Devils caught up and won both the Midwestern Regional and DCI East.  The two corps went into DCI Championships in Orlando seemingly neck-and-neck, but the Devils dominated the Championships, and rather than The Cavaliers getting their sixth crown, the Devils gained their eleventh.  In 2004, the corps hosted a percussion reunion; Cavalier drummers from 1948 through 2004, including every snare drummer since 1961, gathered to play together.  Then The Cavaliers' "007" show of tunes from James Bond movies powered through the season, losing once to the Devils and twice to The Cadets en route to the sixth DCI title that had eluded the corps the previous year.  After the DCI Championships in Denver, The Cavaliers, The Cadets, Madison Scouts, Phantom Regiment, Blue Devils, and Santa Clara Vanguard, the winners of all but two DCI Championships made a four show tour through California. In early 2008, Jeff Fiedler stepped down after seventeen years as The Cavaliers' director.  He was replaced by former director Adolph DeGrauwe. After their 2006 title, The Cavaliers remained in the top four at DCI Finals until finishing eighth in 2012, seventh in 2013, and sixth in 2014.

Sponsorship
The Cavaliers Drum & Bugle Corps is a 501(c)(3) not-for-profit organization sponsored by The Village of Rosemont, Illinois and has a Board of Directors. The Chairman Emeritus is Don Warren, the Corps Chairman is Adolph DeGrauwe, the Corps President is Chris Hartowicz, the Executive Director is Monte Mast, the Corps Director is Michael Vaughn.  In addition to The Cavaliers Drum & Bugle Corps, the organization also sponsors Chromium Winds, a co-ed indoor marching wind ensemble that will compete in WGI Winds. the Classic Cavaliers alumni; Midwest Connection, an all-age community-based drum and bugle corps that will compete in DCI's SoundSport; and GearWORKS which hosts "Chop Sessions"– intensive workshops geared towards students looking to develop their individual skills for drum corps, winter percussion, indoor winds, and other performing ensembles.

In conjunction with the all-male Cavaliers Indoor Percussion that performs in WGI Independent World class, the organization is also co-sponsoring, with the Crystal Lake Strikers performing arts organization, Crystal Lake Thunder, a new co-ed percussion ensemble that will compete in WGI's Independent A class.

Show summary (1972–2022)
Source:

Caption awards
At the annual World Championship Finals, Drum Corps International (DCI) presents awards to the corps with the high average scores from prelims, semifinals, and finals in five captions. The Cavaliers have won these caption awards: 

Don Angelica Best General Effect Award/Formerly Known: High General Effect
 1990 (tie), 1995, 2001, 2002, 2004, 2006
John Brazale Best Visual Performance Award/Formerly Known: High Visual
 1991, 1992, 2000, 2002, 2004, 2006
George Zingali Best Color Guard Performance Award
 2000, 2002, 2004, 2007
Jim Ott Best Brass Performance Award
 2002, 2006
Fred Sanford Best Percussion Performance Award/Formerly Known: High Percussion
 1991 (tie), 1992, 1995, 1999, 2000, 2011

References

Bibliography

External links

Drum Corps International World Class corps
Rosemont, Illinois
Musical groups established in 1948
1948 establishments in Illinois